Trinidad Ardiles (born 10 May 2003) is a Chilean swimmer. She competed in the women's 200 metre backstroke event at the 2018 FINA World Swimming Championships (25 m), in Hangzhou, China.

References

External links
 

2003 births
Living people
Chilean female backstroke swimmers
Place of birth missing (living people)
Swimmers at the 2018 Summer Youth Olympics